The Trading Floor is a 2018 Hong Kong financial thriller television miniseries produced by Andy Lau and directed by Wong Kwok-keung. The series stars Francis Ng, Joseph Chang and Yu Nan, with special appearances by Patrick Tam and Maggie Cheung, while the recurring cast includes Liu Kai-chi, Carlos Chan, Poon Chan-leung, Jacky Cai and Jiang A-Joe. Co-produced by Fox Networks Group, Tencent Penguin Pictures and Lau's Focus Television Production, The Trading Floor premiered on 24 May 2018 on Star Chinese Movies, as well as being available for streaming for subscribers on Fox +, with every episode airing each Thursday.

Plot
Anthony Yip (Francis Ng), the Secretary of the Minister of Economic Development, collaborates with the "Three Financial Giants": Eastman Properties president Ronald Man (played by Albert Cheung), Evergate Construction Materials president Fok Kin (Mark Cheung) and Marco Media president Cheung Yung (Law Kar-ying) to manipulate the financial market for profit. In order to generate an even greater gain, Yip brings back financial genius Wai Hong (Joseph Chang) from Myanmar, where he had been hiding from international authorities, in order to set the stage for a new financial crisis.

Wai manipulates the stock market with a series of expert moves, but because of back-to-back involvement in numerous incidents of financial interference, he attracts the attention of Securities & Futures Commission investigator Claudia Fang (Yu Nan) while, wall the players are unknowingly walking into a trap set by Yip.

Yip and Wai were formerly members and the best brother-in-arms of an underground financial elite team CASH for the last ten years. Together with two other members, Nick Cheuk (played by Patrick Tam) and Pamela (played by Maggie Cheung), they defeated some financial giants to prevent a market-maker's actions in an attempt to turn back the damage done to the market ecology. Unfortunately, Yip suddenly turns on them, betraying everyone in his team. From then on, Wai and Yip become sworn enemies. Hong forms his own CASH team with  new members BJ (Carlos Chan), Sarah (Jacky Cai), Dow (Jiang A-joe) and Master (Poon Chan-leung) to stop Yip from another of his conspiracies.

Cast

Main cast
Francis Ng as Anthony Yip (葉抱一)
Joseph Chang as Wai Hong (韋航)
Yu Nan as Claudia Fong (方旋)

Special appearance
Patrick Tam as Nick Cheuk (卓意寧)
Maggie Cheung Ho-yee as Pamela

Recurring cast
Liu Kai-chi as Law Kai-chung (羅啟中)
Gwei Lun-mei as Anna
Carlos Chan as BJ
Poon Chan-leung as Master (老爺)
Jacky Cai as Sarah (莎)
Jiang A-Joe as Dow
Albert Cheung as Ronald Man (文啟山)
Mark Cheung as Fok Kin (霍堅)
Law Kar-ying as Cheung Yung (張融)
Alan Luk as Cheung Chak-san (張澤新)
Justin Cheung as Leung Kai (梁佳)
Fish Liew
Anna Ng
Leung Kin-ping
Deno Cheung

Production

Development
The project was first announced at the 2017 Hong Kong Filmart on 12 March 2017 as a five-episode miniseries to be produced by Andy Lau, co-produced by Lau's Focus Television Production and Fox Networks Group, and set to be aired on Fox's Star Chinese Movies. The series is created by Cora Yim, the head of Chinese entertainment and territory head of Hong Kong for Fox Networks Group with Wong Kwok-keung, directed of the acclaimed 2014 HKTV series, The Election, was set to direct. With a total budget of US$5 million (US$1 million per episode), development for the series took a total of three years.

Filming
The series held its production commencement ceremony in April 2017 where the cast was also unveiled, which include Francis Ng, Joseph Chang, Yu Nan, Patrick Tam, Maggie Cheung Ho-yee, Carlos Chan, Poon Chan-leung, Jacky Cai and Jiang A-Joe. Filming for The Trading Floor began in May 2017 Cyberjaya, Malaysia, where locations and sets portraying an older Hong Kong were available. Production wrapped up in late June of the same year.

Release
On 8 May 2018, the series released its official trailer and poster and was announced its premier on 24 May 2018 on Fox's Star Chinese Movies network and the streaming platform, Fox +

On 23 May 2018, the series held a global press conference where it was attended by producer Lau, director Wong and cast members Ng, Chang, Tam, Cheung, Liu, Chan, Cai and Fish Liew. The series premiered the following day, airing two episodes, while each new episode will air every Thursday.

Awards

See also
Andy Lau filmography

References

External links
Official website
The Trading Floor on Facebook

2010s Hong Kong television series
2018 Hong Kong television series debuts
Serial drama television series
Financial thrillers
Cantonese-language television shows
Fox Broadcasting Company original programming
Television series set in 1997
Television series set in 2017